Caloptilia perisphena is a moth of the family Gracillariidae. It is known from Sichuan, China; Tamil Nadu, India; and Sri Lanka.

References

perisphena
Moths of Asia
Moths described in 1905